The Oison is a small river in the Eure department, Normandy, France. It is a left tributary of the Seine. Its source is in the commune of Saint-Amand-des-Hautes-Terres, and it flows into the Seine near Saint-Pierre-lès-Elbeuf.

Val d'Oison

Eight villages in the valley of the Oison (Val d'Oison) are twinned with the civil parish of Clanfield, United Kingdom.

References

External links
Val d'Oison
Clanfield twinning

Rivers of France
Rivers of Eure
Rivers of Normandy